The International Union of Kettlebell Lifting (IUKL), is an international association which brings together around 40 national federations of kettlebell sport worldwide.

Kettlebell lifting is a weightlifting sport practiced with kettlebells of fixed weights (24 kg for women and 32 kg for men) and each sport consists of a maximum number of lifts in a fixed time. The development of the sport came from Eastern Europe.

History 
The European Union of Kettlebell Lifting (EUWL) was created in 1992 from five Eastern European countries: Estonia, Lithuania, Russia, Ukraine and Belarus. The headquarters of the organisation is based in the town of Talsi, in Latvia. The EUWL became the first official international organisation in the field of kettlebell lifting, with the idea of developing a European movement. Three European championships were organised with the participation of four countries in 2002.

In May 2006, in Riga, Latvia, an extraordinary congress took place to decide to accept a number of new members to the European Union - Latvia and Moldova.

In August 2007, the decision was made to make the movement international and to become the International Union of Kettlebell Lifting. Since 2008, due to its new status, IUKL organises the World Championships.

In September 2009, at the General Assembly of TAFISA, the IUKL became a member. The organisation has had observer status at the Global Association of International Sports Federations since October 2017.

Member associations 
In 2016, the federation had around 40 members. Two other organisations, International Kettlebell and Strength Training Academy (IKSA) and Johann Martin Academie (JMA), are also members.

South Ossetia also has its own delegation.

References

International sports organizations
Sports organizations established in 2007
Organisations based in Latvia
Talsi